Elmalı, Antalya is a district in Antalya province in Turkey.
It was settled by Turks, and came under Ottoman rule during the rein of Bayezid I.

References

Villages in Elmalı District

tr:Elmalı, Antalya